Events from the year 1913 in France.

Incumbents
President: Armand Fallières (until 18 February), Raymond Poincaré (starting 18 February)
President of the Council of Ministers: 
 until 21 January: Raymond Poincaré 
 21 January-22 March: Aristide Briand
 22 March-9 December: René Viviani
 starting 9 December: Gaston Doumergue

Events
17 January –  Raymond Poincaré is elected president 
3 February – Trial of the remnants of the Bonnot gang begins.
20 August – 700 feet above Buc, parachutist Adolphe Pegoud jumps from an airplane and lands safely.
23 September – Aviator Roland Garros flies over the Mediterranean.

Arts and literature
29 May – Igor Stravinsky's ballet score The Rite of Spring is premiered in Paris.
12 December – Vincenzo Perugia tries to sell Mona Lisa in Florence and is arrested.
30 December – Italy returns Mona Lisa to France.

Sport
29 June – Tour de France begins.
27 July – Tour de France ends, won by Philippe Thys of Belgium.

Births

January to March
5 January – Pierre Veuillot, Cardinal (died 1968)
17 February – Louis Bouyer, priest and writer (died 2004)
24 February – François Bourbotte, soccer player (died 1972)
27 February – Paul Ricoeur, philosopher (died 2005)
3 March – Roger Caillois, writer and intellectual (died 1978)
12 March – Max Leognany, artist (died 1994)
18 March – René Clément, screenwriter and film director (died 1996)
26 March – Maurice Lafforgue, alpine skier (died 1970)
26 March – Jacqueline de Romilly, philologist (died 2010)
28 March – Jean-Marie Goasmat, cyclist (died 2001)

April to June
14 April – Jean Fournet, conductor (died 2008)
18 May – Charles Trenet, singer and songwriter (died 2001)
26 May –
Pierre Daninos, writer and humorist (died 2005)
André Lalande, officer (died 1995)
9 June – Jean Nicolas, international soccer player (died 1978)
18 June – Pierre Berès, bookseller and antiquarian book collector (died 2008)
26 June – Aimé Césaire, poet, author and politician (died 2008)

July to December
12 July – Roger Testu, cartoonist (died 2008)
13 July – Fabien Galateau, cyclist (died 1995)
17 July – Roger Garaudy, author and philosopher (died 2012)
July – Colette de Jouvenel, daughter of writer Colette (died 1981)
31 August – Jacques Foccart, politician (died 1997)
10 October – Claude Simon, novelist, recipient of the Nobel Prize in Literature for 1985 (died 2005)
13 October – Pierre Jaïs, bridge player (died 1988)
7 November – Albert Camus, author, philosopher and journalist, recipient of the Nobel Prize in Literature for 1957 (died 1960)
20 November – Charles Bettelheim, economist and historian (died 2006)
29 November – Georges Spénale, writer, poet and politician, President of the European Parliament (died 1983)
11 December – Jean Marais, actor (died 1998)

Full date unknown
Pierre Probst, cartoonist (died 2007)

Deaths
2 January – Léon Teisserenc de Bort, meteorologist (born 1855)
14 June – Louis-Robert Carrier-Belleuse, painter and sculptor (born 1848)
20 August – Émile Ollivier, statesman, 30th Prime Minister of France (born 1825)
6 September – Henri Menier, businessman and adventurer (born 1853)
15 November – Camille Armand Jules Marie, Prince de Polignac, nobleman, scholar and major general in the Confederate States Army (born 1832)
5 December – Ferdinand Dugué, poet and playwright (born 1816)

See also
 List of French films of 1913

References

1910s in France